Detumomab is a mouse monoclonal antibody targeting human B-cell lymphoma.

References

Monoclonal antibodies for tumors